Propst House is a historic home located at Hickory, Catawba County, North Carolina. It was built in 1881, and is a -story, Second Empire style frame dwelling.  It has a mansard roof, a square mansard tower, and interesting wooden ornament.

It was listed on the National Register of Historic Places in 1973.  It is located in the Oakwood Historic District.

The house has been restored by the Hickory Landmarks Society and operated as a late 19th-century historic house museum.

References

External links
 Propst House - Hickory Landmarks Society

Hickory, North Carolina
Houses on the National Register of Historic Places in North Carolina
Houses completed in 1881
Second Empire architecture in North Carolina
Houses in Catawba County, North Carolina
National Register of Historic Places in Catawba County, North Carolina
Museums in Catawba County, North Carolina
Historic house museums in North Carolina
Historic district contributing properties in North Carolina
1881 establishments in North Carolina